Hugh Thompson may refer to:

Hugh Thompson (American actor) (born 1887), American silent-film actor
Hugh Thompson (architect), American architect
Hugh Thompson (athlete) (1914–1942), Canadian Olympic athlete
Hugh Roderick Thompson  (1915–2006), American opera singer
Hugh Thompson (Canadian actor), Canadian actor
Hugh Thompson (cricketer) (born 1934), English cricketer
Hugh Thompson Jr. (1943–2006), American soldier who helped end the Mỹ Lai Massacre
Hugh Cathcart Thompson (1829–1919), American architect
Hugh Miller Thompson (1830–1903), American Episcopal bishop
Hugh P. Thompson, American judge
Hugh Smith Thompson (1836–1904), American politician and governor of South Carolina, 1882–1886

See also
Hugh Thomson (1860–1920), Irish illustrator
Hugh Thomson (writer), British travel writer, filmmaker and explorer
Hugh Christopher Thomson (1791–1834), Canadian businessman, publisher and politician
Herbert Hugh Thompson, American computer security expert